Tal-Qadi Temple is a megalithic temple in Salina, limits of Naxxar, Malta. It is in a very bad state of preservation, with only the temple's general outline still visible.

Site
The site of Tal-Qadi was possibly in use around 4000 BC, during the Ġgantija phase of Maltese prehistory, but the temple itself was built during the Tarxien phase between 3300 and 3000 BC. The temple continued to be used during the Tarxien Cemetery phase, since pottery sherds from that era have been found.

Tal-Qadi is the only temple in Malta which is orientated to the north-east. Most other temples face the south or south-east, but in the case of Tal-Qadi this would not have been possible since there is a steep slope in that direction.

Today, the temple is in poor condition, with few remains visible apart from its general outline. The remains of a central area and two apses can still be seen. The temple probably contained another two apses, giving it a four-apse shape which was typical of the late temple period. No traces of the temple's façade exist.

Excavation and recent history

The scattered remains of the temple, spread out on an upper and a lower field, were discovered by Henry Sant, a government civil engineer, in 1916. The area was excavated in 1927 by Themistocles Zammit and L. Upton Way. According to Zammit, years before the identification of the temple, the tenant of the site had destroyed a group of upright stones. These might have been the remains of the temple's missing façade or its outer casing.

The remains of the temple were surveyed and mapped in 1952.

During the early excavations, a broken globigerina limestone slab showing five sections separated by lines, and incised with star-like figures and a crescent shape in the middle was found. This slab possibly was a star map or a moon calendar. It is now located in the National Museum of Archaeology in Valletta.

The following pictures explain how the sky tablet of Tal-Qadi can be used in order to measure the ecliptic latitude of the moon or the planets that always apparently move along the arc of the ecliptic:

Full history
Full history p. 36-44.

References

External links

National Inventory of the Cultural Property of the Maltese Islands
Wikibook: The Tal-Qadi Sky Tablet

Megalithic Temples of Malta
Neolithic sites
Naxxar
1916 archaeological discoveries
National Inventory of the Cultural Property of the Maltese Islands